Munster Irish is the dialect of the Irish language spoken in the province of Munster. Gaeltacht regions in Munster are found in the Gaeltachtaí of the Dingle Peninsula in west County Kerry, in the Iveragh Peninsula in south Kerry, in Cape Clear Island off the coast of west County Cork, in Muskerry West; Cúil Aodha, Ballingeary, Ballyvourney, Kilnamartyra, and Renaree of central County Cork; and in an Rinn and an Sean Phobal in Gaeltacht na nDéise in west County Waterford.

History
The north and west of Dingle Peninsula are today the only place in Munster where Irish has survived as the daily spoken language of most of the community although the language is spoken on a daily basis by a minority in other official Gaeltachtaí in Munster.

Historically, the Irish language was spoken throughout Munster and Munster Irish had some influence on those parts of Connacht and Leinster bordering it such as Kilkenny, Wexford and south Galway and the Aran Islands.

Munster Irish played an important role in the Gaelic revival of the early 20th century. The noted author Peadar Ua Laoghaire wrote in Munster dialect and stated that he wrote his novel Séadna to show younger people what he viewed as good Irish:

Peig Sayers was illiterate, but her autobiography, Peig, is also in Munster dialect and rapidly became a key text. Other influential Munster works are the autobiographies Fiche Blian ag Fás by Muiris Ó Súilleabháin and An tOileánach by Tomás Ó Criomhthain.

Lexicon
Munster Irish differs from Ulster and Connacht Irish in a number of respects. Some words and phrases used in Munster Irish are not used in the other varieties, such as:
 "under" (standard )
 "Irish language" (Cork and Kerry),  (Waterford) (standard )
 "that...not" and  "that is not" as the copular form (both  in the standard)
 "also" (Connacht , Ulster )
 In both demonstrative pronouns and adjectives speakers of Munster Irish differentiate between  "this" and  "that" following a palatalised consonant or front vowel and  "this" and  "that" following a velarised consonant or back vowel in final position:  "this road",  "that cow",  "that cart",  "this fence"
 the preposition  "to, towards", common in Connacht Irish and Ulster Irish where it developed as a back formation from the 3rd person singular preposition chuige "towards him" is not used in Munster. The form chun (from Classical Irish do chum), also found in the West and North, is used in preference.
 Munster Irish uses a fuller range of "looking" verbs, while these in Connacht and Ulster are restricted:  "looking", "watching",  "carefully observing",  "look, watch", glinniúint "gazing, staring", sealladh "looking" etc.
 the historic dative form  "house", as in Scots and Manx Gaelic, is now used as the nominative form (Standard )
 Corca Dhuibhne and Gaeltacht na nDéise use the independent form  (earlier , classical also ) "I see" as well as the dependent form ficim / feicim   (classical ), while Muskerry and Clear Island use the forms chím (independent) and ficim.
 The adjective   is used adverbially in phrases such as  "rather small", "fairly small",  "quite large". Connacht uses  and Ulster 
 Munster differentiates between  "anyway", "anyhow" and  "particularly", "especially"
  is "difference" in Munster, and is a Latin loan:  "there is no difference between them"; the Gaelic word deifir "hurry" is retained in the other dialects (c.f. Scottish Gaelic  "difference")
  or   "hurry" whereas the other major dialects use

Phonology
Symbols appearing in the upper half of each row are velarized (traditionally called "broad" consonants) while those in the bottom half are palatalized ("slender"). The consonant  is neither broad or slender.

The vowels of Munster Irish are as shown on the following chart. These positions are only approximate, as vowels are strongly influenced by the palatalization and velarization of surrounding consonants.

In addition, Munster has the diphthongs .

Some characteristics of Munster that distinguish it from the other dialects are:
 The fricative  is found in syllable-onset position. (Connacht and Ulster have  here.) For example,  "moved" is pronounced  as opposed to  elsewhere.
 Word-internal clusters of obstruent + sonorant,  + , and stop + fricative are broken up by an epenthetic , except that plosive + liquid remains in the onset of a stressed syllable.
 Orthographic short a is diphthongized (rather than lengthened) before word-final m and the Old Irish tense sonorants spelled nn, ll (e.g.   "head").
"horsemen" .
 Stress is attracted to noninitial heavy syllables:   "pot",   "satchel".

Morphology
Irish verbs are characterized by having a mixture of analytic forms (where information about person is provided by a pronoun) and synthetic forms (where information about number is provided in an ending on the verb) in their conjugation. Munster Irish has preserved nearly all of the synthetic forms, except for the second-person plural forms in the present and future:

Some irregular verbs have different forms in Munster than in the standard (see Dependent and independent verb forms for the independent/dependent distinction):

Past tense verbs can take the particle  in Munster Irish, even when they begin with consonants. In the standard language, the particle is used only before vowels. For example, Munster  or  "he broke" (standard only ).

The initial mutations of Munster Irish are generally the same as in the standard language and the other dialects. ,   "gave birth" ,   "they will not go" .

Syntax

 "the man whose sister is in the hospital" (standard an fear a bhfuil...)

Notable speakers

Some notable Irish singers who sing songs in the Munster Irish dialect include Nioclás Tóibín, Elizabeth Cronin, Labhrás Ó Cadhla, Muireann Nic Amhlaoibh, Seán de hÓra, Diarmuid Ó Súilleabháin, Seosaimhín Ní Bheaglaoich and Máire Ní Chéilleachair.

References

Bibliography

Literature

 [folklore, Ring]

 [Kerry]
 [short stories, folklore, Limerick]

 [folklore, Cape Clear Island]

 [Dingle Peninsula]
 [Dingle Peninsula]

 [Coolea]
 [Kerry]
 [Kerry]
 [Kerry]
 [Kerry]
 [Kerry]
 [Kerry]
 [Kerry]
 [Kerry]
 [Kerry/Blasket Islands]

 [Kerry/Blasket Islands]

 [Tipperary]
 [Kerry/Blasket Islands]

 

 Gaeltacht na nDéise, Co. Waterford]

External links

a blog and resources for the study of Cork Irish 
Croidhe Cainnte Chiarraighe 
Glór: Cork
Tigh Mhuiris: Documenting the Irish of Cléire

Irish dialects
Irish